This is a list of newspapers in Brunei.

Berita Brunei -  first published in March 1957; October 1959 it was renamed as Berita Borneo
Bintang Harian - published in both Malay and English; first appeared in March 1966
Borneo Bulletin -  first appeared on November 7, 1953; the only newspaper in Brunei to publish seven days a week
BruDirect - also known as Brunei Direct; an online newspaper and the largest online media information tool; a pioneer in the field of online media in Brunei Darussalam; the website has an audience of 70,000 to 80,000 visits per day
The Brunei Times - introduced in 2006, defunct since 2016
The Daily Star - published in both Malay and English; first appeared in March 1966
Government's Pelita Brunei -   first published in 1956
Media Permata - Brunei's only daily newspaper in Malay language
Pelita Brunei
Salam Seria - first published in 1952 by the British Malayan Petroleum Company
Suara Bakti - publication by a former political party;  published in October 1961
The Brunei Post - introduced in 2021, an independent online publication start-up.

See also
Newspapers List of Brunei

List of newspapers

Brunei
Newspapers